Javier Antonio Grbec (born 24 March 1986) is an Argentine former footballer who played for clubs including Unión San Felipe, Ñublense and Cobresal.

External links
 Profile at BDFA
 

1986 births
Living people
Argentine footballers
Argentine expatriate footballers
Deportivo Morón footballers
Club Atlético Brown footballers
Quilmes Atlético Club footballers
Unión San Felipe footballers
Chilean Primera División players
Expatriate footballers in Chile
Expatriate footballers in Ecuador
Expatriate footballers in Slovenia
Argentine people of Slovenian descent
Ñublense footballers
Cobresal footballers
People from Hurlingham Partido
Association football forwards
Sportspeople from Buenos Aires Province